Bryan Coleman (29 January 1911 – 4 July 2005) was a British film actor and television actor.

In 1954 he appeared in William Douglas Home's comedy The Manor of Northstead in the West End.

Selected filmography
 Conquest of the Air (1936) – Minor Role (uncredited)
 Sword of Honour (1939) – Unlisted (uncredited)
 A Window in London (1940) – Constable
 Jassy (1947) – Sedley – the Architect
 Train of Events (1949) – Actor (segment "The Actor")
 Landfall (1949) – PO Weaver (uncredited)
 The Lost Hours (1952) – Tom Wrigley
 The Planter's Wife (1952) – Capt. Dell (uncredited)
 When Knighthood Was in Flower (1953) – Earl of Surrey
 You Know What Sailors Are (1954) – Lt. Comdr. Voles
 Loser Takes All (1956) – Elegant Man at Casino (uncredited)
 Suspended Alibi (1957) – Bill Forrest
 The Tommy Steele Story (1957) – Hospital Doctor
 The Truth About Women (1957)
 Blood of the Vampire (1958) – Monsieur Auron
 The Hand (1960) – Adams
Crooks Anonymous (1962) – Holding
 The Longest Day (1962) – Ronald Callen (uncredited)
 Life in Danger (1964) – Chief Constable Ryman
 Mr. Brown Comes Down the Hill (1965) – Bishop
 Give a Dog a Bone (1965) – Lord Swill
 Happy Deathday (1968) – Dr. Oliver Tarquin
 Zeppelin (1971) – Colonel Whippen
 Mona Lisa (1986) – Gentleman in Mirror Room
  (1987)
 The Crying Game (1992) – Judge
 Chaplin (1992) – Drunk

Television roles
William Tell, 'Boy Slaves', 1958, as the Count Heinemann
 Happily Ever After (1961–1964) – Harry Watkins
 Adam Adamant Lives! (1966) – Major Fitzgibbon
 Upstairs, Downstairs (1972) – Sir William Manning
 The Duchess of Duke Street (1976–1977) – Lord Henry Norton
 Hazell (1978) – Charles Courtney
 The Incredible Mr Tanner (1981)– 	 Commissionaire

References

External links
 

1911 births
2005 deaths
British male film actors
British male television actors
Male actors from London